There have been three baronetcies created for persons with the surname Savile, all in the Baronetage of England.

The Savile baronetcy, of Thornhill in the County of York, was created on 29 June 1611 for George Savile, MP for Boroughbridge 1586–1587 and Yorkshire 1592. His great-grandson was later created Marquess of Halifax.

The Savile baronetcy, of Methley in the County of York, was created on 29 June 1611 for Henry Savile. He was MP for Aldborough and York. It became extinct on his death.

The Savile baronetcy, of Copley in the County of York, was created 24 July 1662 for John Savile. It became extinct on his death.

Savile baronets, of Thornhill (1611)
 See Marquess of Halifax

Savile baronets, of Metheley (1611)
 Sir Henry Savile, 1st Baronet (1579–1632) – extinct on his death

Savile baronets, of Copley (1662)
 Sir John Savile, 1st Baronet ( – 1689) – extinct on his death

References

 

Extinct baronetcies in the Baronetage of England
1611 establishments in England